Leatherneck is a military slang term for a member of the United States Marine Corps.

Leatherneck may also refer to:

In military uses
 Leatherneck Magazine, a magazine for current and former members of the U.S. Marine Corps
 Camp Leatherneck, a U.S. Marine Corps base in Afghanistan
 The Leatherneck, the post newspaper of the Marine Corps Institute
 Lou Diamond (1890–1951), USMC Master Gunnery Sergeant, nicknamed "Mr. Leatherneck"

In entertainment and media

Fictional characters
 Leatherneck (G.I. Joe), a fictional character from the G.I. Joe universe

Film
(Chronological)
 The Leatherneck, a 1929 film nominated for an Academy Award for Best Writing (Adapted Screenplay)
 Leathernecking, a 1930 film by Edward F. Cline
 Flying Leathernecks, a 1951 film by Nicholas Ray
 Leathernecks, the English title of the 1989 Italian film Colli di cuoio

Games
 Leatherneck, 1988 game for Amiga and Atari ST computers by MicroDeal
 Leatherneck, an expansion module for Battle Hymn, the Japanese-theatre version of the wargame Ambush!
 Leathernecks are a Cult-affiliated enemy in the 2018 retro-styled FPS DUSK

Music
 "Leatherneck", a song by Every Time I Die from The Big Dirty
 "Leatherneck", a song by Paul Revere & the Raiders

In sports
 Western Illinois Leathernecks, the sports teams of Western Illinois University